Xin Tong (born January 6, 1987 in Harbin, Heilongjiang) is a Chinese swimmer, who competed for Team China at the 2008 Summer Olympics.

Major achievements
2003/2004 National Champions Tournament - 1st 4×200 m freestyle relay
2003 National Championships - 1st 4×200 m freestyle relay
2003 National Short-Course Championships - 1st 4×200 m freestyle relay

References
http://2008teamchina.olympic.cn/index.php/personview/personsen/1295

1987 births
Living people
Chinese male freestyle swimmers
Swimmers from Harbin
Olympic swimmers of China
Swimmers at the 2008 Summer Olympics
21st-century Chinese people